Siddaganga Institute of Technology (SIT) is an engineering college located in Tumkur, Karnataka, India. It is affiliated with Visvesvaraya Technological University (VTU) and is recognized by the All India Council for Technical Education (AICTE).

Sports
The college has facilities for encouraging sports and games. Has well equipped gymnasium, basketball, volleyball court, cricket ground, race track, badminton court, and an indoor stadium.

It was established in 1963 under the auspices of the Sri Siddaganga Education Society.

Ranking

Siddaganga Institute of Technology is ranked 101 among engineering colleges by the National Institutional Ranking Framework (NIRF) in 2021.

References

External links

 
 Siddaganga Mutt

Affiliates of Visvesvaraya Technological University
Educational institutions established in 1963
Universities and colleges in Tumkur district
Education in Tumkur
1963 establishments in Mysore State